Anders Abdull-Gaffar Haidar Noshe (born 9 January 2006) is a Danish professional footballer who plays as a right winger for Danish Superliga club AaB.

Career

AaB
Raised in Gug, a district in the south of Aalborg, Noshe began his career at Gug Boldklub, before joining Aalborg Chang and later AaB.

Already in November 2021, 15-year old Noshe began training with AaB's Danish Superliga team. In February 2022, Noshe was called up for his first ever professional game. On 20 March 2022, Noshe became the youngest (16 years & 70 days) debutant ever in the Danish Superliga for AaB, when he came on from the bench in the 87th minute against Brøndby IF. On 22 June 2022 AaB confirmed, that Noshe had signed a contract extension until the end of 2024.

References

External links

Anders Noshe at DBU

2006 births
Living people
Danish men's footballers
Association football wingers
Denmark youth international footballers
Danish Superliga players
AaB Fodbold players
Sportspeople from Aalborg